María Falcón is a Puerto Rican television reporter, show host and television producer. She worked for many years at channel 6 and at Channel 7 on Puerto Rico's television and as of 2016, on a television show named GeoAmbiente, which is transmitted on a television channel named Sistema TV.

During a very long time, Falcón, along with Miss Universe 1985 Deborah Carthy-Deu and legendary actor and comedian Yoyo Boing, hosted a television show named Desde Mi Pueblo on WIPR-TV.

During 2013, she was personally nominated by Puerto Rican governor Alejandro García Padilla to become channel 6's president.

During 2021, Falcón was given a special award by WIPR-TV for her continuing work on Puerto Rican television.

Personal
Falcón is a native of Bayamón, Puerto Rico. She and her husband Steve Dalmau, a construction industry executive, live at Barrio Cubuy in Canóvanas, Puerto Rico.

See  also
 List of Puerto Ricans

External links

Living people
Year of birth missing (living people)
Puerto Rican television people
Puerto Rican television journalists
Puerto Rican television producers
People from Bayamón, Puerto Rico
People from Canóvanas, Puerto Rico